B. N. Agarwal is a former judge at Supreme Court of India. He started as a judge at Patna High Court in November 1986. Later, he was promoted as the Chief Justice at Orissa High Court in November 1999. He got to the Supreme Court of India as a judge on October 19, 2000 and retired in 2009. He opposed National Judicial Commission legislation in 2014 that could move judges from one state to other. He said, 

“If Judiciary is finished, democracy will be finished. This bill (National Judicial Appointments Commission) affects the independence of the judiciary, there is no doubt about it. The way Governors are being transferred to Mizoram, the Chief Justices and judges of the HCs will be transferred to newly created HCs in North East. No judge will be able to pass strong orders."

References 

Justices of the Supreme Court of India
Year of birth missing (living people)
Living people
Chief Justices of the Orissa High Court
Judges of the Patna High Court